Tazoudasaurus is a genus of vulcanodontid sauropod dinosaurs hailing from the Early Jurassic, located in the High Atlas Mountains of Morocco in North Africa. Along with Ohmdenosaurus is one of the two formally described sauropods from the Toarcian of the Northern Hemisphere.

Discovery
The remains, consisting of the holotype, a partial adult skeleton (specimen To 2000–1) and associated partial juvenile skeleton (specimen To 2000-2) found in continental detrital sediments of the Toarcian aged Azilal Formation, were discovered in the early 2000s and were described by Ronan Allain et al. in early 2004. The generic name derives from one of the localities, Tazouda, while the specific descriptor is a latinization of the Berber term for "slender" due to the animal's small size for a sauropod. Its fossil was found alongside that of Berberosaurus and an indeterminate large theropod.

Description
 
Teeth wear in V-shaped marks indicates tooth occlusion, suggesting that vulcanodontids processed food orally when feeding. The frontal and the parietal are incomplete, the former being broken anteriorly and the latter posteriorly. The neck is flexible with elongate vertebrae that lack true pleurocoels while dorsal and caudal vertebrae series tend to be more rigid. T. naimi bears the most complete fossil skeleton for Early Jurassic sauropod remains found to date due to the scarcity of exposed strata of that age.

Classification
This sauropod is most closely related to  Vulcanodon, differing only in caudal vertebrae features while it also possesses characters that place it outside Eusauropoda.

A  cladogram after Pol and colleagues, 2021:

See also 

 Atlasaurus
 Atlas Mountains

References 

Vulcanodontidae
Early Jurassic dinosaurs of Africa
Toarcian life
Jurassic Morocco
Fossils of Morocco
Fossil taxa described in 2004
Taxa named by Dale Russell
Taxa named by Philippe Taquet